H. R. Mithrapala (15 March 1946 – 18 September 2019) was a Sri Lankan politician, a member of the Parliament of Sri Lanka and a government deputy minister.

References

 

1946 births
2019 deaths
Members of the Sabaragamuwa Provincial Council
Provincial councillors of Sri Lanka
Members of the 13th Parliament of Sri Lanka
Members of the 14th Parliament of Sri Lanka
Government ministers of Sri Lanka
Sri Lanka Freedom Party politicians
United People's Freedom Alliance politicians
Alumni of Bandaranayake College, Gampaha